The Canadian electro-industrial band Skinny Puppy has released twelve studio albums and two extended plays along with a number of live albums, compilations, and singles. The group formed in 1982 and released its debut EP, Back & Forth, in 1984. Later that year, Skinny Puppy was picked up by Nettwerk and released another EP, Remission, in December 1984. The band's first studio album, 1985's Bites, was its last with the original lineup of vocalist Nivek Ogre and producer / multi-instrumentalist cEvin Key; Dwayne Goettel joined in 1986, and the band released its next two albums, Mind: The Perpetual Intercourse and Cleanse Fold and Manipulate, in 1986 and 1987 respectively.

VIVIsectVI (1988), Skinny Puppy's fourth album, was one of the band's most well-received efforts, placing on Melody Maker's best of 1988 list and garnering several retrospective accolades. Bradley Torreano of AllMusic hailed the album as a masterpiece, and Jim Harper of the same publication saw VIVIsectVI as the beginning of electro-industrial music. Rabies followed VIVIsectVI in 1989 and marked the band experimenting with industrial metal thanks to the influence of Ministry frontman Al Jourgensen. Key and Goettel expressed dissatisfaction with the album, and Skinny Puppy quickly returned to the studio for its sixth album, 1990's Too Dark Park.

Too Dark Park was another critical highlight of the band's career, and Key described it as a return to form for Skinny Puppy. In 1992, with the band on the brink of dissolution due to Ogre's worsening drug addiction, Last Rights was released and saw the band pushing further into extreme noise territory. The making of Skinny Puppy's next and eighth album, The Process (which would eventually be released in 1996), was fraught with difficulties both internal and external; the band shifted to a new record label with a new recording studio and new producers, Ogre left, Goettel died of a heroin overdose, and the band ultimately dissolved with the album unfinished. Following dissolution, Skinny Puppy released several compilations and a live improvisation album titled Puppy Gristle (which had been recorded in 1993). Ogre and Key reunited in 2000 and a year later released a live album documenting Skinny Puppy's revival. The band returned to the studio and released The Greater Wrong of the Right in 2004, Mythmaker in 2007, HanDover in 2011, and Weapon in 2013.

Albums

Studio albums

Extended plays

Compilation albums

Live albums

Other releases

Singles

References

External links
 Skinny Puppy on AllMusic
 Skinny Puppy on Bandcamp
 Skinny Puppy on Discogs

Discography
Discographies of Canadian artists